1987 Masters may refer to:
1987 Masters Tournament, golf
1987 Masters (snooker)
1987 Nabisco Masters, tennis